Brit Awards 1997  was the 17th edition of the Brit Awards, an annual pop music awards ceremony in the United Kingdom. It was organised by the British Phonographic Industry and took place on 24 February 1997 at Earls Court Exhibition Centre in London.

Performances

Winners and nominees

Outstanding Contribution to Music
Bee Gees

Multiple nominations and awards
The following artists received multiple awards and/or nominations.

Notable moments

Geri Halliwell's Union Jack dress and wardrobe malfunction
Ginger Spice, Geri Halliwell, wore the Union Jack dress whilst performing onstage with the group. Spicemania was at its height in the UK and the Spice Girls had just cracked the US as well, reaching number 1 with their debut single and album. Geri Halliwell captured the zeitgeist and became pin-up girl for Cool Britannia.

Halliwell was originally going to wear an all-black dress, but she thought it was too boring so her sister sewed on a Union Jack tea-towel, with a 'peace' sign on the back, so as to not offend anyone. It was worn during the Spice Girls' performance of their number one song "Who Do You Think You Are". Later on she sold her dress in a charity auction to Hard Rock Cafe in Las Vegas for a record £41,320, giving Halliwell the Guinness World Record for the most expensive piece of pop star clothing ever sold. The performance won Most Memorable Performance Of 30 Years at the 2010 Brit Awards.

As well her famous Union Jack dress; Geri Halliwell wore a lengthy cut top red dress during the show. When walking up to the stage to collect their award; Geri Halliwell's right breast slipped out from her dress in front of cameras and host Ben Elton.

Melanie C and Liam Gallagher
Prior to the ceremony in 1997, Oasis member Liam Gallagher stated in the British media that he wasn't going to the Brit Awards because if he bumped into the Spice Girls, he would smack them. In response to this, as the Spice Girls received the award for Best British Single, during their acceptance speech, Sporty Spice challenged Gallagher by saying "Come and have a go if you think you're hard enough".

References

External links
Brit Awards 1997 at Brits.co.uk

Brit Awards
BRIT Awards
BRIT Awards
Brit Awards
Brit
Brit Awards